Amorphoscelis elegans is a species of praying mantis found in Ghana, Guinea, Togo, and Equatorial Guinea (Bioko).

References

Amorphoscelis
Insects of West Africa
Fauna of Bioko
Insects described in 1913